The Yorkshire dialect (also known as Broad Yorkshire, Tyke, Yorkie or Yorkshire English) is a dialect of English, or continuum of dialects, spoken in the Yorkshire region of Northern England. The dialect has roots in Old English and is influenced by Old Norse. The Yorkshire dialect has faded and faces extinction, but organisations such as The Yorkshire Dialect Society and the East Riding Dialect Society exist to promote its use.

The dialect has been represented in classic works of literature such as Wuthering Heights, Nicholas Nickleby and The Secret Garden, and linguists have documented variations of the dialect since the nineteenth century. In middle of the twentieth century, the Survey of English Dialects collected dozens of valuable recordings of authentic Yorkshire dialects.

Early history and written accounts 
In the fragments of early dialect work, there seems to have been few distinctions across large areas: in the early 14th century, the traditional Northumbrian dialect of Yorkshire showed few differences with the dialect spoken at Aberdeen, now often considered a separate Scots language. The dialect has been widely studied since the 19th century, with an early work by William Stott Banks in 1865 on the dialect of Wakefield, and another by Joseph Wright who used an early form of phonetic notation in a description of the dialect of Windhill, near Bradford. Significant works that covered all of England include Alexander John Ellis's 1899 book On Early English Pronunciation, Part V, and the English Dialect Dictionary, which was published in six volumes between 1898 and 1905.

Charles Dickens' Nicholas Nickleby (1839) and Emily Brontë's Wuthering Heights (1847) are notable nineteenth century works of literature which include examples of contemporary Yorkshire dialects. The following is an excerpt of Brontë's use of Yorkshire dialect in Wuthering Heights, with a translation to standard English below:'Aw wonder how yah can faishion to stand thear i' idleness un war, when all on 'ems goan out! Bud yah're a nowt, and it's no use talking—yah'll niver mend o'yer ill ways, but goa raight to t' divil, like yer mother afore ye!''I wonder how you can stand there in idleness and worse, when all of them have gone out! But you're a nobody, and it's no use talking—you'll never mend your evil ways, but go straight to the Devil, like your mother before you!'

Geographic distribution 
Yorkshire is a massive territory and the dialects are not identical in all areas. In fact, the dialects in the North and East Ridings are fairly different to that of the West Riding as they retained the original Northumbrian characteristics. The Yorkshire Dialect Society draws a border roughly at the River Wharfe between two main zones. The area southwest of the river is Northumbrian in origin, but with influence from the East Midlands dialects since the Industrial Revolution, whilst that to the northeast, like Geordie, the Cumbrian dialect and the Scots language, is descended more purely from the Northumbrian dialect. The distinction was first made by A. J. Ellis in On Early English Pronunciation. The division was approved of by Joseph Wright, the founder of the Yorkshire Dialect Society and the author of the English Dialect Dictionary. Investigations at village level by the dialect analysts Stead (1906), Sheard (1945) and Rohrer (1950) mapped a border between the two areas.  A rough border between the two areas was mapped by the Swiss linguist Fritz Rohrer, having undertaken village-based research in areas indicated by previous statements by Richard Stead and J.A. Sheard, although there were "buffer areas" in which a mixed dialect was used, such as a large area between Leeds and Ripon, and also at Whitgift, near Goole.

One report explains the geographic difference in detail:This distinction was first recognised formally at the turn of the 19th / 20th centuries, when linguists drew an isophone diagonally across the county from the northwest to the southeast, separating these two broadly distinguishable ways of speaking. It can be extended westwards through Lancashire to the estuary of the River Lune, and is sometimes called the Humber-Lune Line. Strictly speaking, the dialects spoken south and west of this isophone are Midland dialects, whereas the dialects spoken north and east of it are truly Northern. It is possible that the Midland influence came up into the region with people migrating towards the manufacturing districts of the West Riding during the Industrial Revolution.

Over time, speech has become closer to Standard English and some of the features that once distinguished one town from another have disappeared.  In 1945, J. A. Sheard predicted that various influences "will probably result in the production of a standard West Riding dialect", and K. M. Petyt found in 1985 that "such a situation is at least very nearly in existence". However, the accent of Hull and East Yorkshire remains markedly different. The accent of the Middlesbrough area has some similarities with Geordie accents.

One anomalous case in the West Riding is Royston, which absorbed migrants from the Black Country at the end of the 19th century.  The speech of Royston contrasts with that of nearby Barnsley, as it retains some Black Country features.

Authentic recordings 
The Survey of English Dialects in the 1950s, 1960s and 1970s recorded over 30 examples of authentic Yorkshire dialects which can be heard online via the British Library Sound Archive. Below is a selection of recordings from this archive:

 Miss Madge Dibnah (b.1890) of Welwick, East Yorkshire, "female housekeeper". According to the Library, "much of her speech remains part of the local dialect to this day". 
 Cooper Peacock (b.1887) of Muker, North Yorkshire, farmer.
 Unidentified speaker of Golcar, West Yorkshire, mill worker.
 Mrs Hesselden (b.1882) of Pateley Bridge North Yorkshire.
 Easton, Ronald (b.1895) of Skelton, North Yorkshire, farmer.

Pronunciation 
Some features of Yorkshire pronunciation are general features of northern English accents. Many of them are listed in the northern English accents section on the English English page.

Vowels
 Words such as strut, cut, blood, lunch usually take , although  is a middle-class so-called "fudged" variant.
 Most words affected by the trap-bath split in South East England – the distinction between the sounds  and  – are not affected in Yorkshire.  The long  of southern English is widely disliked in the "bath"-type words.  However, words such as palm, can't, spa are pronounced with a long vowel, usually more fronted .
However, words with gh in the spelling (e.g. straight, weight), as well as exclamations and interjections such as hey and eh (the tag question), are usually pronounced with a diphthong .
In a recent trend, a fronted monophthong  is common amongst young women, although this has been the norm for a long time in Hull (where it originates from). Other words spelled ow were pronounced with an aw sound  such as know, snow, and blow, from old English āw. This four-way split was found throughout all northern England and contrasted with the historic two-way split found in the south and midlands.
 If a close vowel precedes , a schwa may be inserted.
 When  precedes  in a stressed syllable,  can become .  For example, very can be pronounced .
 In Hull, Middlesbrough and the east coast, the sound in word, heard, nurse, etc. is pronounced in the same way as in square, dare.
 In other parts of Yorkshire, this sound is a short  or long .  This seems to have developed as an intermediate form between the older form  (now very rare in these words) and the RP pronunciation . 
 In Hull, Middlesbrough and much of the East Riding, the phoneme  (as in prize) may become a monophthong  before a voiced consonant. For example, five becomes  (fahv), prize becomes .
 In the south of the west riding, there is a tendency to pronounce the diphthong  (as in mouth) as a monophthong  (mahth) like in the east midlands, from where it originates. This is characteristic of informal speech in this area and may coexist with the more formal . It occurs more in specific words – such as down, about, now, how, and out – than others.
 Words like city and many are pronounced with a final  in the Sheffield area.
 A prefix to a word is more likely not to take a reduced vowel sound in comparison to the same prefix's vowel sound in other accents.
 In some areas of the Yorkshire Dales (e.g.

The following features are recessive or even extinct, generally they are less common amongst younger than older speakers in modern Yorkshire:
 Words originating from old English ō (e.g. goose, root, cool, roof) historically had an  sound in the west riding as well as an  sound in the north and east ridings, today a more RP like pronunciation  is found in all Yorkshire accents.
 Long vowel  in words such as book, cook, and look. Whilst some speakers adhere to the long vowel sound, other speakers adhere to the short vowel sound so much it is overextended so that food is also said this way.
 Where and there often become a diphthong .
 Words such as door, floor, four may take a variety of diphthongal pronunciations  .
 Words that end -ight join the fleece lexical set, today they can still be heard in their dialectal forms.  For example, neet  and reet . This can also be heard in Nova Scotia, Geordie and the Lancashire dialect.

Consonants
 In some areas, an originally voiced consonant followed by a voiceless one can be pronounced as voiceless.
However,  can be heard in Sheffield.
 H-dropping is common in informal speech, especially amongst the working classes.
 Omission of final stops  and fricatives , especially in function words. As in other dialects, with can be reduced to wi, especially before consonants. Was is also often reduced to wa (pronounced roughly as "woh"), even when not in contracted negative form (see table below).
 A glottal stop may also be used to replace  (e.g. like becomes ) at the end of a syllable.
 In some areas, an alveolar tap  (a 'tapped r') is used after a labial (pray, bright, frog), after a dental (three), and intervocalically (very, sorry, pair of shoes).

Some consonant changes amongst the younger generation are typical of younger speakers across England, but are not part of the traditional dialect:

The following are typical of the older generation:
 In Sheffield, cases of initial "th"  become . This pronunciation has led to Sheffielders being given the nickname "dee dahs" (the local forms of "thee" and "thou"/"tha").
  realised as  before .  For example, clumsy becomes .

Rhoticity
At the time of the Survey of English Dialects, most dialects in Yorkshire were non-rhotic, but full rhoticity could be found in Swaledale, Lonsdale, Ribblesdale, and the rural area west of Halifax and Huddersfield.  In addition, the dialects on the east coast of Yorkshire retained rhoticity when  was in final position but not in pre-consonantal position.  A 1981 MA study found that rhoticity persisted in the towns of Hebden Bridge, Lumbutts and Todmorden in Upper Calderdale.

Rhoticity seems to have been more widespread in Yorkshire in the late 19th and early 20th century: for example, the Wakefield dialect was marked as rhotic in the works of AJ Ellis and the recording of a prisoner of war from Wakefield in the Berliner Lautarchiv displayed rhotic speech, but Wakefield dialect now is firmly non-rhotic.

Further information

These features can be found in the English Accents and Dialects collection on the British Library website. This website features samples of Yorkshire (and elsewhere in England) speech in wma format, with annotations on phonology with X-SAMPA phonetic transcriptions, lexis and grammar.

See also

Vocabulary and grammar

A list of non-standard grammatical features of Yorkshire speech is shown below.  In formal settings, these features are castigated and, as a result, their use is recessive.  They are most common amongst older speakers and amongst the working classes.

 Definite article reduction: shortening of the to a form without a vowel, often written t'. See this overview and a more detailed page on the Yorkshire Dialect website, and also .
 Some dialect words persist, although most have fallen out of use. The use of owt and nowt, derived from Old English a wiht and ne wiht, mean anything and nothing, as well as summat to mean something. Other examples of dialect still in use include flayed (sometimes ) (scared), laik (play), roar (cry), aye (yes), nay (emphatic "no"), and all (also), anyroad (anyway) and afore (before).
 When making a comparison such as greater than or lesser than, the word "nor" can be used in place of "than", e.g. better nor him.
 Nouns describing units of value, weight, distance, height and sometimes volumes of liquid have no plural marker. For example, ten pounds becomes ten pound; five miles becomes five-mile.
 The word us is often used in place of me or in the place of our (e.g. we should put us names on us property).
 Use of the singular second-person pronoun thou (often written tha) and thee. This is a T form in the T–V distinction, and is largely confined to male speakers.
 Were can be used in place of was when connected to a singular pronoun. The reverse – i.e. producing constructions such as we was and you was – is also heard in a few parts of Yorkshire (e.g. Doncaster). This is also common in Rotherham, South Yorkshire. Pronouncing 'hospital' as 'hospickle' and 'little' as 'lickle' is also common in Rotherham, as is shop workers and bus drivers greeting both males and females as 'love' or 'duck'.
 While is often used in the sense of until (e.g. unless we go at a fair lick, we'll not be home while seven.) Stay here while it shuts might cause a non-local to think that they should stay there during its shutting, when the order really means that they should stay only until it shuts. Joseph Wright wrote in the English Dialect Dictionary that this came from a shortening of the older word while-ever.
 The word self may become sen, e.g. yourself becomes thy sen, tha sen.
 Similar to other English dialects, using the word them to mean those is common, e.g. This used to be a pub back in them days.
 The word right is used to mean very or really, e.g. If I'm honest, I'm not right bothered about it.
 As in many non-standard dialects, double negatives are common, e.g. I was never scared of nobody.
 The relative pronoun may be what or as rather than that, e.g. other people what I've heard and He's a man as likes his drink.  Alternatively there may be no relative pronoun, e.g. I've a sister lives there.

Contracted negatives 
In informal Yorkshire speech, negatives may be more contracted than in other varieties of English. These forms are shown in the table below.

Scandinavian Yorkshire 
Scandinavian Yorkshire (also referred to as Jórvík) or Danish/Norwegian York is a term used by historians for Yorkshire and it's Ridings during the period of the late 7th century to the first half of the 10th century shortly before the Yorkshire Genocide conducted by the English Crown & Royal Family during the Norman Conquest.

Yorkshire was dominated by Norse warrior-kings; in particular, "Jórvík" is used to refer to York, the largest City controlled by these kings.

Yorkshire's Anglo-Scandinavian monarchy controlled varying amounts of Britain, Northumbria, Jorvik, and the Danelaw from 875 to 1070, however the area was invaded and conquered for short periods by England between 927 and 954 before eventually being annexed into England after the Harrying of the North and targeted killing of the established Anglo-Danish and Norwegian nobility.

The Kingdom of Jórvík was closely associated with the much longer-lived Kingdom of Dublin throughout this period.

Yorkshire Dialect Society
The Yorkshire Dialect Society exists to promote and preserve use of this extensively studied and recorded dialect; there is also an East Riding Dialect Society.

The Yorkshire society is the oldest of the county dialect societies; it grew out of the committee of workers formed to collect material for the English Dialect Dictionary. The committee was formed in October 1894 at Joseph Wright's suggestion and the Yorkshire Dialect Society was founded in 1897. It publishes an annual volume of The Transactions of the Yorkshire Dialect Society; the contents of this include studies of English dialects outside Yorkshire, e.g. the dialects of Northumberland, and Shakespeare's use of dialect.  It also publishes an annual Summer Bulletin of dialect poetry.

In the early 1930s, the society recorded gramophone records of dialect speakers from Baildon, Cleveland, Cowling, Driffield and Sheffield.  The recording from Cowling was provided by Lord Snowden of Ickornshaw.

Significant members have included Joseph Wright, Walter Skeat, Harold Orton, Stanley Ellis, J. D. A. Widdowson, K.M. Petyt, Graham Shorrocks, Frank Elgee, and Clive Upton.

Although Joseph Wright was involved in the Society's foundation, the Society's annual Transactions published one of the first critiques of his work in 1977.  Peter Anderson, then the editor of the Transactions, argued that Wright took much of his material for his work English Dialect Grammar without sufficient citation from the work of Alexander John Ellis, and that Wright did Ellis "a disservice" by criticising this same work.

Yorkshire dialect and accent in popular culture
Wilfred Pickles, a Yorkshireman born in Halifax, was selected by the BBC as an announcer for its North Regional radio service; he went on to be an occasional newsreader on the BBC Home Service during World War II. He was the first newsreader to speak in a regional accent rather than Received Pronunciation, "a deliberate attempt to make it more difficult for Nazis to impersonate BBC broadcasters", and caused some comment with his farewell catchphrase "... and to all in the North, good neet".

The director Ken Loach has set several of his films in South or West Yorkshire and has stated that he does not want actors to deviate from their natural accent. The relevant films by Loach include Kes (Barnsley), Days of Hope (first episode in south of West Yorkshire), The Price of Coal (South Yorkshire and Wakefield), The Gamekeeper (Sheffield), Looks and Smiles (Sheffield) and The Navigators (South and West Yorkshire). Loach's films were used in a French dialectological analysis on changing speech patterns in South Yorkshire. Loach said in his contribution that the speech in his recently released film The Navigators was less regionally-marked than in his early film Kes because of changing speech patterns in South Yorkshire, which the authors of the article interpreted as a move towards a more standard dialect of English.

Dialect of the northern dales featured in the series All Creatures Great and Small.

A number of popular bands hail from Yorkshire and have distinctive Yorkshire accents. Singer-songwriter YUNGBLUD, originating from Doncaster, preserves a strong Yorkshire accent. Louis Tomlinson, who was a member of One Direction, is from Yorkshire and in his solo music his accent is often heard. Joe Elliott and Rick Savage, vocalist and bassist of Def Leppard; Alex Turner, vocalist of the Arctic Monkeys; Jon McClure, of Reverend and The Makers; Jon Windle, of Little Man Tate; Jarvis Cocker, vocalist of Pulp; and Joe Carnall, of Milburn and Phil Oakey of The Human League are all known for their Sheffield accents, whilst The Cribs, who are from Netherton, sing in a Wakefield accent. The Kaiser Chiefs originate in Leeds, as does the Brett Domino Trio, the musical project of comedian Rod J. Madin. Graham Fellows, in his persona as John Shuttleworth, uses his Sheffield accent, though his first public prominence was as cockney Jilted John. Toddla T, a DJ on BBC Radio 1 and 1Xtra, has a strong Sheffield accent and often uses the phrase "big up thysen" (an adaptation into Yorkshire dialect of the slang term "big up yourself" which is most often used in the music and pop culture of the Jamaican diaspora). Similarly, grime crews such as Scumfam use a modern Sheffield accent, which still includes some dialect words.

The Lyke Wake Dirge, written in old North Riding Dialect, was set to music by the folk band Steeleye Span.

Actor Sean Bean normally speaks with a Yorkshire accent in his acting roles, as does actor Matthew Lewis, famously known for playing Neville Longbottom in the Harry Potter films.

Wallace of Wallace and Gromit, voiced by Peter Sallis, has his accent from Holme Valley of West Yorkshire, despite the character living in nearby Lancashire. Sallis has said that creator Nick Park wanted a Lancashire accent, but Sallis could only manage to do a Yorkshire one.
 
The late British Poet Laureate, Ted Hughes originated from Mytholmroyd, close to the border with Lancashire, and spent much of his childhood in Mexborough, South Yorkshire. His own readings of his work were noted for his "flinty" or "granite" voice and "distinctive accent" and some said that his Yorkshire accent affected the rhythm of his poetry.

The soap opera Emmerdale, formerly Emmerdale Farm, was noted for use of broad Yorkshire, but the storylines involving numerous incomers have diluted the dialect until it is hardly heard.

In the ITV Edwardian/interwar period drama Downton Abbey, set at a fictional country estate in North Yorkshire between Thirsk and Ripon, many of the servants and nearly all of the local villagers have Yorkshire accents. BBC One series Happy Valley and Last Tango in Halifax, both from creator Sally Wainwright of Huddersfield, also heavily feature Yorkshire accents.

In the HBO television series Game of Thrones, many of the characters from the North of Westeros speak with Yorkshire accents, matching the native dialect of Sean Bean, who plays Lord Eddard "Ned" Stark.

Several of the dwarfs in the Peter Jackson film adaptation of The Hobbit, namely Thorin Oakenshield, Kíli and Fili, speak with Yorkshire accents.

The character of the Fat Controller in the Thomas and Friends TV series, as voiced by Michael Angelis, has a broad Yorkshire accent.

"On Ilkla Moor Baht 'at", a popular folk song, is sung in the Yorkshire dialect and accent and considered to be the unofficial anthem of Yorkshire.

Actress Jodie Whittaker keeps her native Yorkshire accent in her role as the Thirteenth Doctor in Doctor Who.

Freeware action game Poacher by Ben "Yahtzee" Croshaw features Yorkshireman as a protagonist and majority of the in-game dialogues is done in Yorkshire dialect.

Studies have shown that accents in the West Riding (that is, mostly, modern West and South Yorkshire), and by extension local dialects, are well-liked among Britons and associated with common sense, loyalty, and reliability.

Books written in Yorkshire dialect 
 Yorkshire Ditties (Series 1) by John Hartley
 [https://www.gutenberg.org/ebooks/17799 'Yorkshire Ditties] (Series 2) by John Hartley
 Yorkshire Puddin'  by John Hartley, 1876
 Yorkshire Tales (Series 3) by John Hartley
 Yorkshire Dialect Poems (1673–1915) and traditional poems by Frederic William Moorman
 Songs of the Ridings by Frederic William Moorman
 A Yorkshire Dialect Reciter; compiled by George H. Cowling, author of "A Yorkshire Tyke", "The Dialect of Hackness", &c. London: Folk Press Ltd, [1926] 
 A Kind of Loving and Joby by Stan Barstow. (specifically that of Dewsbury and Ossett)
 Most of the dialogue in GB84 by David Peace
 A Kestrel for a Knave later turned into the film Kes The Secret Garden (parts of) by Frances Hodgson Burnett
 Wuthering Heights (parts of) by Emily Brontë (note that this is very old-fashioned Haworth dialect)

Notes

 References 

Bibliography
 
 
 
 
 
 

Further reading
 
 All Creatures Great and Small by James Herriot (film and TV series)
 
 
 
 
 Up and Down in the Dales, In the Heart of the Dales, Head Over Heels in the Dales'', by Gervase Phinn
 
 
 

Several nineteenth century books are kept in specialist libraries.

External links 
 Sounds Familiar? – Listen to examples of regional accents and dialects from across the UK on the British Library's 'Sounds Familiar' website
 English Accents and Dialects collection on the British Library Collect Britain website.
 Yorkshire Dialect Society
 Gramophone recordings of Yorkshire dialect made by the Yorkshire Dialect Society in the 1930s, advertised to the society's members in 1937
 East Riding Dialect Society at Yorkshire Dialect website by Barry Rawling
 Chapter from an 1892 book on "Yorkshire Folk Talk". The descriptions focus on the dialect specifically of the East Riding
 Dialect Poems from the English regions
 Whoohoo Yorkshire Dialect Translator
 Guide to Yorkshire words given to international recruits to the Doncaster West N.H.S.
 A Glossary of Provincial Words in Use at Wakefield in Yorkshire, 1865, full book online, copyright has expired.
 Yorkshire Dialect from the BBC's "The Story of English."
 Yorkshire Sayings, Phrases and Dialect, I'm From Yorkshire

English language in England
Yorkshire culture